The Finance & Invest Brussels formerly know in French Société Régionale d'Investissement de Bruxelles – S.R.I.B. or Gewestelijke Investeringsmaatschappij voor Brussel – G.I.M.B. in Dutch was founded by the Brussels-Capital Region in 1984 to provide capital to the Brussels-Capital Region industry. The purpose of the SRIB/GIMB is to invest in the equity of unlisted companies (private equity).

See also
 Economy of Belgium
 Brussels Enterprises Commerce and Industry
 GIMV
 Regional Investment Company of Wallonia
 Science and technology in the Brussels-Capital Region
 Science and technology in Flanders
 Science and technology in Wallonia

Sources
 Facts from Belgium
 2007 was recordjaar voor GIMB, De Morgen

External links
 

Investment companies of Belgium
Companies based in Brussels
Financial services companies established in 1984
1984 establishments in Belgium